Myra Reynolds Richards (31 January 1882 – 1934) was an American sculptor and teacher. She was born in Indianapolis. She studied at the Herron Art Institute in Indianapolis mainly under Mary Y. Robinson, Roda Selleck, and Otto Stark, J. Ottis Adams, William Forsyth, Clifton Wheeler, Rudolf Schwarz, and George Julian Zolnay.  She also studied in New York under Isidore Konti and in Paris with Charles Despiau at the Académie Scandinave.

She was an instructor of anatomy and modelling class at the Herron Art Institute, Indianapolis from 1920. She become the head of department of anatomy and sculpture at Herron Art Institute before her resignation at 1929.

Selected works

 James Whitcomb Riley statue, Hancock County Courthouse, Greenfield, Indiana, 1918
 Murphy Memorial Drinking Fountain, at the Carroll County Courthouse, 1918
 Pan, 1923. Richards' Pan was stolen in 1970 and the current work is a replacement.
 Syrinx, 1923. Richards' Syrinx was stolen in 1959 and the current statue is a replacement.
 The Bird Boy, 1924, at the Columbus Central Middle School

Sources

American women sculptors
Artists from Indianapolis
1882 births
1934 deaths
Herron School of Art and Design faculty
20th-century American sculptors
20th-century American women artists
Sculptors from Indiana